Room No.? is a Burmese action drama television series. It aired on MRTV-4, from December 17, 2019 to January 28, 2020, on Mondays to Fridays at 19:00 for 30 episodes.

Cast
Kyaw Hsu as Banyar
Nay Chi Shoon Lak as Nan Saw
Wint Yamone Naing as Nwe Ni Hlaing
Mya Hnin Yee Lwin as Hsu Htet
 Lin Myat as Nay Yaung Htun

References

Burmese television series
MRTV (TV network) original programming